Jeddo may refer to:

Jeddo, Japan
Jeddo, Michigan, a populated place in St. Clair County
Jeddo, Missouri, an unincorporated community
Jeddo, Pennsylvania, a borough in Luzerne County
Jeddo, Texas, a populated place in Bastrop County

See also 
 Yeddo, Indiana, a populated place in Fountain County